The National Science Advisory Board for Biosecurity (NSABB) is a panel of experts that reports to the Secretary of the United States Department of Health and Human Services. It is tasked with recommending policies on such questions as how to prevent published research in biotechnology from aiding terrorism, without slowing scientific progress.

The NSABB is a federal advisory committee that addresses issues related to biosecurity and dual use research at the request of the United States Government. The NSABB has up to 25 voting members with a broad range of expertise including molecular biology, microbiology, infectious diseases, biosafety, public health, veterinary medicine, plant health, national security, biodefense, law enforcement, scientific publishing, and other related fields.

History
In May 2016, the NSABB published "RECOMMENDATIONS FOR THE EVALUATION AND OVERSIGHT OF PROPOSED GAIN-OF-FUNCTION RESEARCH".

Publications
The NSABB had published 11 reports as of February 2021. The first report on the list was released in December 2006.

Composition
The NSABB is composed of non-voting ex officio and appointed voting members. As of 2021, the Chair of the NSABB was Gerald W. Parker, Jr., DVM, PhD.

As of 2017, the ex officio members were:
 Department of Commerce: 
Jason Boehm, Ph.D., Office of Program Analysis and Evaluation, National Institute of Standards and Technology Division Head 
 Department of Defense : 
 David Christian Hassell, Ph.D., Deputy Assistant Secretary of Defense for Nuclear and Chemical and Biological Programs 
 Department of Energy: 
 Sharlene Weatherwax, Ph.D., Associate Director of Science for Biological and Environmental Research
 Department of Health and Human Services 
 Anthony S. Fauci, M.D., Director, National Institute of Allergy & Infectious Disease 
 Sally Phillips, R.N., Ph.D., Deputy Assistant Secretary, Office of Policy and Planning, Office of the Assistant Secretary for Preparedness and Response
 CAPT Carmen Maher, Deputy Director, Office of Counterterrorism and Emerging Threats (OCET), Office of the Commissioner, Food and Drug Administration
 Michael W. Shaw, Ph.D., Senior Advisor for Laboratory Science, Office of Infectious Diseases, Centers for Disease Control and Prevention
 Department of Homeland Security 
 Wendy Hall, Ph.D., Special Senior Advisor for Biological Threats, Office of Chemical, Biological, and Nuclear Policy
 Department of the Interior 
 Anne E. Kinsinger, Associate Director for Biology, U.S. Geological Survey
 Department of Justice 
 Edward You, Supervisory Special Agent, FBI Weapons of Mass Destruction Directorate 
 Department of State 
 Christopher Park, Director, Biological Policy Staff, Bureau of International Security and Nonproliferation
 Department of Veterans Affairs 
 Brenda A. Cuccherini, Ph.D., M.P.H. Special Assistant to the Chief Research and Development Officer, Veterans Health Administration 
 Environmental Protection Agency, 
 Gregory Sayles, Ph.D., Acting Director, National Homeland Security Research Center
 Executive Office of the President 
 Gerald Epstein, Ph.D., Assistant Director for Biosecurity and Emerging Technologies, National Security and International Affairs Division, Office of Science and Technology Policy
 Intelligence Community 
 Amanda Dion-Schultz, Ph.D., Office of the Chief Scientist 
 Robert M. Miceli, Ph.D., Biological Issue Manager and Advisor to the Director, Office of the Director of National Intelligence
 National Aeronautics and Space Administration 
 David R. Liskowsky, Ph.D., Director, Medical Policy & Ethics, Office of the Chief Health and Medical Officer
 Department of Agriculture 
 Steven Kappes, Ph.D. Deputy Administrator, Animal Production and Protection

References

External links
National Science Advisory Board for Biosecurity
NPR profile, July 2, 2005

United States Department of Health and Human Services
Biotechnology organizations
United States national commissions
Biosecurity